The Washington Street Shoe District of Haverhill, Massachusetts encompasses a two block section of Washington and Wingate Streets, between Railroad Square and Essex Street, in which there were more than 60 shoe factories established in the late 19th century.  Buildings in the district are predominantly brick with Italianate styling, and are of a modest scale (three or four stories), unlike later shoe factories which resembled textile mills in size and style.  The district was listed on the National Register of Historic Places in 1976.

See also
National Register of Historic Places listings in Essex County, Massachusetts

References

Historic districts in Essex County, Massachusetts
Buildings and structures in Haverhill, Massachusetts
National Register of Historic Places in Essex County, Massachusetts
Historic districts on the National Register of Historic Places in Massachusetts